The 1865 Florida gubernatorial election was held on November 29, 1865. Democratic nominee David S. Walker ran completely unopposed and was elected unanimously. 

This election was the first Floridian gubernatorial election following the beginning of Reconstruction.

General election

Candidates

Democratic 

 David S. Walker

Results

References 

 
 

1865 Florida elections
Florida
Florida gubernatorial elections